Nemanja Bjelica (born 9 May 1988) is a Serbian professional basketball player for Fenerbahçe of the Turkish Basketball Super League and the EuroLeague. He also represents the senior Serbian national basketball team internationally. Bjelica was an All-Euroleague First Team selection as well as the Euroleague MVP in 2015. Bjelica started his NBA career as a 27-year-old rookie when he signed in 2015 and played for the Minnesota Timberwolves for three seasons before signing with the Sacramento Kings in the 2018 offseason. In 2021, he was traded to the Miami Heat before signing with the Warriors during the offseason. With the Warriors, he won an NBA championship in 2022.

Professional career

Arkadia Traiskirchen (2007–2008) 
Bjelica began playing basketball at Aca Janjić basketball school, before joining the youth system of KK Partizan. He began his professional career in the 2007–08 season with the Arkadia Traiskirchen Lions of the Austrian League, averaging 8.5 points in 26 games.

Crvena zvezda (2008–2010) 
After one season abroad, he returned to the Serbian team Crvena zvezda, and spent two successful seasons there, under head coach Svetislav Pešić. During the 2008–09 season, he made breakthroughs, and earned a place in the first lineup. He was particularly noted for his performance during the EuroCup, for his outside shooting. Later in his career, Bjelica cited coach Pešić as one of the main reasons for his improvement as a player. Coach Pešić trusted Bjelica with the ball, and gave the 6"10 Bjelica a primary ball handler role on several occasions, which helped to develop Bjelica as a play-maker.

Bjelica was drafted by the Washington Wizards with the 35th pick of the 2010 NBA draft. His draft rights were then traded to the Minnesota Timberwolves.

Saski Baskonia (2010–2013) 
In August 2010, Bjelica signed a five-year contract with Spanish club Saski Baskonia. In his first season with the club, he didn't get much playing time, averaging only 9 minutes played per game. In his second season with Baskonia, he averaged 4.8 points per game, on 56% shooting from the field, and 47% shooting from 3 point range, three in 13 minutes played per game. His third and last season with the club was the most successful, as he played in 26 games, with the averages of 9.9 points, 4.8 rebounds, 1.3 assists, and 1 steal per game, on 46% shooting from the field.

Fenerbahçe (2013–2015) 
On 22 July 2013, Bjelica signed a three-year deal with the Turkish team Fenerbahçe Ülker, which was led by one of Europe's great coaches, Željko Obradović. He cited Obradović as the main reason why he didn't go to the NBA instead. In the 2013–14 season, he immediately became one of the key Fenerbahçe Ülker players, averaging career highs of 10.4 points, 6.1 rebounds, 2.2 assists, and 1.6 steals per game over 24 EuroLeague games.

The following season, Bjelica's game saw its most improvement and consistency. On 30 March 2015, he was named the EuroLeague MVP of the Month for March, his first such monthly award in his career. Over 4 games played in March, he averaged 15 points, 9 rebounds, 3 assists, and 1 block per game. In May 2015, he was chosen to the All-EuroLeague First Team, for his performances over the season. Eventually, Bjelica was named the EuroLeague MVP of the season. Fenerbahçe also advanced to the EuroLeague Final Four for the first time in the team's history. On 15 May 2015, however, they lost in the semifinal game to Real Madrid, by a score of 87–96. Eventually, Fenerbahçe finished in 4th place, after losing in the third-place game to CSKA Moscow, by a score of 80–86. Bjelica had his best season since coming to the club, averaging a career-high 12.1 points, 8.5 rebounds, 1.9 assists, and 1.3 steals per game. Fenerbahçe, however, finished the season without winning any trophy, after also losing in the semi-final series of the Turkish League championship, to the eventual league champions Pınar Karşıyaka.

On 1 July 2015, Bjelica opted out of his contract with Fenerbahçe in order to play in the NBA.

Minnesota Timberwolves (2015–2018) 
On 14 July 2015, Bjelica signed with the Minnesota Timberwolves. He made his debut for the Timberwolves in their season opener on 28 October 2015, recording eight points and five rebounds in a 112–111 win over the Los Angeles Lakers. On 7 November 2015, he had a season-best game with 17 points, 11 rebounds, five assists, one steal and one block against the Chicago Bulls. On 7 April 2016, he scored a season-high 18 points against the Sacramento Kings. Four days later, he recorded 11 points and a season-high 14 rebounds against the Houston Rockets.

On 13 November 2016, Bjelica made his first career start and scored a career-high 24 points in a 125–99 win over the Los Angeles Lakers. On 16 March 2017, he was ruled out for the rest of the 2016–17 season with a left foot injury. He underwent surgery five days later to repair a fractured navicular bone in his left foot.

Bjelica missed 15 games spanning November and December of the 2017–18 season with a sprained left foot. On 8 March 2018, he scored a career-high 30 points on 11-for-16 shooting, including 6 for 9 from 3-point range, in a 117–109 loss to the Boston Celtics. He also had 12 rebounds to record his first 20–10 game in the NBA.

Sacramento Kings (2018–2021) 
On 21 July 2018, just days after backing out of a deal with the Philadelphia 76ers with the intention of returning to Europe, Bjelica signed a three-year, $20.5 million contract with the Sacramento Kings. In his first season with the club, Bjelica averaged 9.6 points, 5.8 rebounds and 1.9 assists per game.

The 2019–20 NBA season was the best season Bjelica had since coming to the NBA, as he averaged 11.5 points, 6.4 rebounds and 2.8 assists over 72 games. The season was suspended in March as a result of COVID-19 pandemic and Sacramento Kings were invited for 22-team 2020 NBA Bubble. Eventually, they did not manage to qualify for the playoffs and finished the season with 31–41 record.

Miami Heat (2021) 
On 25 March 2021, Bjelica was traded to the Miami Heat in exchange for Maurice Harkless and Chris Silva.

Golden State Warriors (2021–2022) 
On August 6, 2021, Bjelica signed with the Golden State Warriors. He made his debut for the Warriors in their season opener on 19 October 2021, recording a double-double off the bench with 15 points and 11 rebounds in a 121–114 win over the Los Angeles Lakers. He became the first player to post a double-double off the bench in his Warriors debut since Sam Williams (16 points, 12 rebounds) on October 30, 1981 at Denver. During the 2022 NBA Finals, Bjelica held Celtics star Jayson Tatum to 0-6 shooting and 4 turnovers en route to his first NBA championship. He became the fourth NBA player from Serbia who won the championship, joining Darko Miličić, Peja Stojaković, and Ognjen Kuzmić.

Return to Fenerbahçe (2022–present) 
On August 9, 2022, Bjelica signed a two-year deal to return to Fenerbahçe Beko, where he was named the EuroLeague MVP of the 2014-15 season. Bjelica made his season debut on 3 March 2023, after missing much of the season due to a calf injury.

National team career

Bjelica played with the senior Serbian national basketball team that won the silver medal at the EuroBasket 2009. He was also a member of the Serbian national team at the 2010 FIBA World Championship, where Serbia was defeated 99-88 by Lithuania in the game for the bronze medal, after they had earlier lost to hosts, Turkey, in a highly controversial semifinals finish. He was also capped for the national team of Serbia at the EuroBasket 2011, in Lithuania, where Serbia finished eighth.

During EuroBasket 2013 in Slovenia, Bjelica became one of the veterans of a very young and incomplete Serbia squad, leading the team alongside captain Nenad Krstić and Nemanja Nedović. Serbia was eventually swept by Spain in the quarterfinals, but the team showed some good performances, particularly against Lithuania and France. During the tournament, he averaged 10 points, 7 rebounds, and 1.9 assists per game, on 54% shooting from the field.

He was also a member of the Serbian national basketball team that won the silver medal at the 2014 FIBA Basketball World Cup under head coach Aleksandar Đorđević. Although his three-point shooting form wasn't impressive during the tournament, he was still one of the most important players of the team, filling all sorts of roles with his handling, passing, rebounding, and scoring. He ended the tournament with averages of 11.9 points, 6.9 rebounds, and 2.8 assists per game.

He was also a member of the team that represented Serbia at the EuroBasket 2015. In Serbia's opening game, an 80–70 win against Spain, he was Serbia's key player, posting 24 points, 10 rebounds, and 4 assists. The following day, he made a game-winning shot against Germany. In the last match of the group phase, he scored 19 points, grabbed 8 rebounds, and had 4 assists against Italy. Serbia dominated in the tournament's toughest group, Group B, with a 5–0 record, and then eliminated Finland and the Czech Republic in the round of 16 and quarterfinal games, respectively. However, they were stopped in the semifinal game by Lithuania, by a score of 67–64, and eventually lost to the host team, France, in the bronze-medal game, by a score of 81–68. Being one of the team's leaders, along with Miloš Teodosić and Miroslav Raduljica, Bjelica averaged 13.9 points, 6.6 rebounds, and 2.7 assists per game, on 56.1% shooting from the field and 37.5% shooting from behind the three-point line.

At the 2019 FIBA Basketball World Cup, the national team of Serbia was dubbed as favorite to win the trophy, but was eventually upset in the quarterfinals by Argentina. With wins over the United States and Czech Republic, it finished in fifth place. Bjelica's statistics suggest he was the third-best player on the team behind Bogdanović and Jokić, averaging 10.7 points, 4.7 rebounds and 2.7 assists over 7 games, while shooting 42.9% from the field.

Awards and accomplishments
Club
 NBA champion: 2022
 2014–15 EuroLeague Final Four with Fenerbahçe
 Zadar Basketball Tournament: 2014, 2015
 Turkish Basketball League: 2013–14
 Turkish President's Cup: 2013

Individual
 2015 EuroLeague MVP
 2015 Serbian Player of the Year
 2015 All-EuroLeague First Team
 2015 All-EuroLeague Forward of the Year
 2015 March Euroleague MVP of the Month with Fenerbahçe
 2010 All-Serbian League First Team
 2009 Best Athlete of SD Crvena Zvezda

Career statistics

NBA

Regular season

|-
| style="text-align:left;"| 
| style="text-align:left;"| Minnesota
| 60 || 0 || 17.9 || .468 || .384 || .727 || 3.5 || 1.4 || .4 || .4 || 5.1
|-
| style="text-align:left;"| 
| style="text-align:left;"| Minnesota
| 65 || 1 || 18.3 || .424 || .316 || .738 || 3.8 || 1.2 || .6 || .3 || 6.2
|-
| style="text-align:left;"| 
| style="text-align:left;"| Minnesota
| 67 || 21 || 20.5 || .461 || .415 || .800 || 4.1 || 1.3 || .7 || .2 || 6.8
|-
| style="text-align:left;"| 
| style="text-align:left;"| Sacramento
| 77 || 70 || 23.2 || .479 || .401 || .761 || 5.8 || 1.9 || .7 || .7 || 9.6
|-
| style="text-align:left;"| 
| style="text-align:left;"| Sacramento
| 72 || 67 || 27.9 || .481 || .419 || .821 || 6.4 || 2.8 || .9 || .6 || 11.5
|-
| style="text-align:left;" rowspan=2| 
| style="text-align:left;"| Sacramento
| 26 || 1 || 16.9 || .460 || .293 || .762 || 3.8 || 1.9 || .3 || .1 || 7.2
|-
| style="text-align:left;"| Miami
| 11 || 2 || 14.2 || .435 || .370 || .556 || 2.5 || 1.8 || .6 || .3 || 5.0
|-
| style="text-align:left;background:#afe6ba;"|†
| style="text-align:left;"| Golden State
| 71 || 0 || 16.1 || .468 || .362 || .728 || 4.1 || 2.2 || .6 || .4 || 6.1
|-class="sortbottom"
| style="text-align:center;" colspan="2"| Career
| 449 || 162 || 20.4 || .466 || .384 || .759 || 4.6 || 1.8 || .6 || .4 || 7.6

Playoffs

|-
| style="text-align:left;"| 2018
| style="text-align:left;"| Minnesota
| 5 || 0 || 9.4 || .438 || .517 || .714 || 3.0 || .6 || .6 || .0 || 4.6
|-
| style="text-align:left;"| 2021
| style="text-align:left;"| Miami
| 2 || 0 || 15.0 || .455 || .500 || .667 || 2.5 || 1.0 || 1.0 || .5 || 9.0
|-
| style="text-align:left;background:#afe6ba;"|2022†
| style="text-align:left;"| Golden State
| 15 || 0 || 10.0 || .529 || .375 || .571 || 2.1 || 1.1 || .3 || .1 || 2.9
|- class="sortbottom"
| style="text-align:center;" colspan="2"| Career
| 22 || 0 || 10.3 || .492 || .478 || .650 || 2.3 || 1.0 || .4 || .1 || 3.8

EuroLeague

|-
| style="text-align:left;"| 2010–11
| style="text-align:left;" rowspan=3| Baskonia
| 13 || 2 || 9.0 || .250 || .222 || .500 || 1.7 || .5 || .2 || .0 || 1.2 || 0.5
|-
| style="text-align:left;"| 2011–12
| 10 || 5 || 13.9 || .563 || .474 || .750 || 2.1 || 1.0 || 1.3 || .3 || 4.8 || 6.2
|-
| style="text-align:left;"| 2012–13
| 26 || 9 || 23.1 || .459 || .310 || .741 || 4.8 || 1.3 || 1.0 || .3 || 9.9 || 10.1
|-
| style="text-align:left;"| 2013–14
| style="text-align:left;" rowspan=2| Fenerbahçe
| 24 || 18 || 25.1 || .474 || .416 || .846 || 6.1 || 2.2 || 1.6 || .4 || 10.4 || 13.6
|-
| style="text-align:left;"| 2014–15
| 29 || 20 || 27.8 || .500 || .351 || .684 || 8.5 || 1.9 || 1.3 || .7 || 12.1 || 18.3
|-class="sortbottom"
| style="text-align:center;" colspan="2"| Career
| 102 || 54 || 22.2 || .476 || .358 || .721 || 5.5 || 1.6 || 1.0 || .4 || 9.0 || 11.6

Personal life
Bjelica was brought up in the New Belgrade Blocks. He married in June 2012 and has a daughter.

See also 

 List of European basketball players in the United States
 List of KK Crvena zvezda players with 100 games played
 List of Serbian NBA players

References

External links

 Nemanja Bjelica at acb.com
 Nemanja Bjelica at euroleague.net
 Nemanja Bjelica at fiba.com
 Nemanja Bjelica at tblstat.net
 

1988 births
Living people
2010 FIBA World Championship players
2014 FIBA Basketball World Cup players
2019 FIBA Basketball World Cup players
ABA League players
Basketball League of Serbia players
Basketball players from Belgrade
Fenerbahçe men's basketball players
Golden State Warriors players
KK Crvena zvezda players
Liga ACB players
Medalists at the 2009 Summer Universiade
Miami Heat players
Minnesota Timberwolves players
National Basketball Association players from Serbia
Power forwards (basketball)
Sacramento Kings players
Saski Baskonia players
Serbia men's national basketball team players
Serbian men's basketball players
Serbian expatriate basketball people in Austria
Serbian expatriate basketball people in Spain
Serbian expatriate basketball people in Turkey
Serbian expatriate basketball people in the United States
Small forwards
Traiskirchen Lions players
Universiade gold medalists for Serbia
Universiade medalists in basketball
Washington Wizards draft picks